Codo is a municipality located in the province of Zaragoza, Aragon, Spain. According to the 2008 census (INE), the municipality has a population of 228 inhabitants.

This town is located in the Campo de Belchite comarca, between Belchite and Quinto.

See also
List of municipalities in Zaragoza

References

Municipalities in the Province of Zaragoza